Sadia Nadeem Malik (born 1 April 1967) is a Pakistani politician  who is the member of punjab assembly on reserved seat of PMLN from 2018 till date and was also a Member of the Provincial Assembly of the Punjab, from May 2013 to May 2018.

Early life and education
She was born on 1 April 1967 in Lahore.

She received the degree of Master of Arts in Political Science  in 1991 from Government College, Lahore.

Political career

She was elected to the Provincial Assembly of the Punjab as a candidate of Pakistan Muslim League (N) (PML-N) on a reserved seat for women in 2013 Pakistani general election.

She was re-elected to the Provincial Assembly of the Punjab as a candidate of PML-N on a reserved seat for women in 2018 Pakistani general election.

References

Living people
Women members of the Provincial Assembly of the Punjab
Punjab MPAs 2013–2018
1967 births
Pakistan Muslim League (N) MPAs (Punjab)
21st-century Pakistani women politicians